The Hershey Public Library is a full-service public library located in Hershey, Pennsylvania. 

The  facility features over 102,000 books, DVDs, CDs, and more.  Its special collections include the Pennsylvania Collection, Palliative Care Collection, and World Languages Collection.

The library is staffed by professional librarians and provides reference service, interlibrary loan, Internet access, and numerous programs for children, teens, and adults.

The library is maintained by Derry Township and is governed by a seven-member Board of Trustees.

History

Cocoa House, 1911-1912

In 1911, editorials appeared in the Hershey Press calling for a public library in Hershey.  In 1912, a permanent public library was created in Hershey by drawing upon the resources of a traveling library from Harrisburg.  The library was housed in the YMCA Building, a part of Cocoa House, a community center that also contained a bank, post office, store, theatre, dormitories, and Hershey Trust Company offices.  Point was made, however, to manage the library through a joint committee of the YWCA and YMCA, enabling resources to be available to both men and women. Librarian Ella F. Kegerreis reported that from February 1912 to January 1913, the library held 338 books and served 256 patrons.

Hershey Department Store, 1913-1914

Hershey Public Library proper was founded in 1913.  The earlier collection was relocated to the Hershey Department Store.  In November 1914, Lynn W. Meekins, a recent graduate from Johns Hopkins University, was appointed librarian.

Hershey Central Theater Building, 1915-1927

In 1914, the library moved to the newly renovated and renamed Hershey Central Theater Building.  As described in the Hershey Press, the library consisted of adult and juvenile book collections, reading tables, electric lighting, and office.  By June 1915, the library reported that circulation had doubled since the same period in 1914.  By December 1915, the Hershey Press reported that in proportion to population, the library’s circulation exceeded that of the New York Public Library.  Also that month, books in Italian were placed in circulation to meet the needs of the area’s Italian-speaking residents.  In 1917, Zelma Baker was appointed librarian.

Post Office building, 1928-1932
In June 1928, the library moved a third time to the second floor of a former post office.

Community Center, 1933-1980
The library found another home in the newly built Community Center in September 1933.

Granada Avenue, 1981-1996
In 1981, the Hershey Public Library moved to the former Derry Township Middle School on Granada Avenue and became a part of the Derry Township municipality. Prior to this, the library was owned by the Milton Hershey foundation.

Cocoa Avenue, 1997-present
In 1996, the library again began to suffer space constraints. A decision was made to create a new building on Cocoa Avenue to house the 77,000 volume collection. This new 29,000 square foot library broke ground in 1996 at the cost of $6 million. On April 26, 1997, the library officially moved to its new location.

Resources

Collections
The library owns more than 102,000 books, videos and DVDs, music cassettes and CDs, puppets, magazines, audio books and software.   Its special collections include the Pennsylvania Collection, Palliative Care Collection, and World Languages Collection.

The Pennsylvania Collection, located in the Hershey Room, contains published materials relating primarily to the history and culture of Pennsylvania with a special focus on Derry Township and Dauphin County.

The Palliative Care Collection features materials dealing with care of the ill, death, and grieving, donated by the Association of Faculty and Friends of the Penn State Milton S. Hershey Medical Center.

The World Languages Collection features a range of materials in foreign languages, including Chinese, Korean, German, Hindi, Russian, and Spanish.

Programs and services
Hershey Public Library’s in-house services include regular programming, classes, and events for adults, teens, and children; public access computer network; reference services; interlibrary loan services; meeting room access; a Library on Wheels service for housebound residents of Hershey, Hummelstown, and Palmyra; and a Teen Advisory Board to involve local youth in library planning.

Friends of the Library
The Friends of the Hershey Public Library was founded over 20 years ago and has contributed over $200,000 to the library since 1994.  The Friends organization also oversees volunteers to shelve or repair books and sponsors distinguished author visits; free adult, teen, and children’s programs; and the Library on Wheels service.

See also

 Dauphin County, Pennsylvania
 Milton S. Hershey

Notes

References
 The Hershey Public Library website contains much of the information used in this article.
 The Derry Township website contains some of the information used in this article.

External links
  Dauphin County Historical Society
 Derry Township Historical Society
 Hershey Community Archives
 Hershey Public Library

Public libraries in Pennsylvania
Government agencies established in 1913
Buildings and structures in Dauphin County, Pennsylvania
Hershey, Pennsylvania
Library buildings completed in 1997
1913 establishments in Pennsylvania